The 2002 Siebel Open was a men's international tennis tournament that took place from February 25 to March 3, 2002. Greg Rusedski was the defending champion but lost in the second round to Todd Martin.

Australian Lleyton Hewitt won in the final 4–6, 7–6(8–6), 7–6(7–4) against American Andre Agassi.

Seeds
A champion seed is indicated in bold text while text in italics indicates the round in which that seed was eliminated.

  Lleyton Hewitt (champion)
  Andre Agassi (final)
  Andy Roddick (semifinals)
  Jan-Michael Gambill (semifinals)
  Greg Rusedski (second round)
  Xavier Malisse (second round)
 n/a
  Wayne Ferreira (quarterfinals)

Draw

External links
 2002 Siebel Open Draw

SAP Open
2002 ATP Tour